The Kikori River is a major river in southern Papua New Guinea on the island of New Guinea. The settlement of Kikori lies on the delta.

Geography 
The catchment area extends from alpine grasslands of the Southern Highlands to mangrove wetlands of the mouth at Papua Gulf.  The Kikori arises at the confluence of the Hegigio with the Mubi (river) or Digimu, into which Lake Kutubu drained. The average rainfall in the Kikori catchment is 5900 mm.

The city of the same name is located on the right bank just before its confluence with the delta.

Economy 
The Kikori river basin is home to large oil and gas fields that have been mined since the 1990s.  A pipeline for oil and gas transport ( Papua New Guinea LNG Project) runs in the Kikori River system from Lake Kutubu over to Papua Gulf.

Biodiversity 
The Kikori river system is known for its biodiversity. Mount Bosavi, which is well-known in this respect, lies on the western edge of the Kikori river basin.  The catchment area of the Kikori includes more than 100 species of fish, of which 14 percent are endemic; along with the western, and much longer Fly River, it is the most species-rich river in New Guinea.  However, most of the endemic fish do not live in the rivers, but in Lake Kutubu.  Furthermore, in the Kikori Basin there are three species of cherax, an endemic blind cavern Oxyeleotris caeca and six species of freshwater turtles.

See also
Kikori
Kikori River languages
Kikori District

References

External links
Kikori- More than just a river

Rivers of Papua New Guinea
Gulf of Papua